Esporte Clube Primavera, commonly referred to as Primavera, is a Brazilian professional association football club based in Indaiatuba, São Paulo. The team competes in the Campeonato Paulista Série A2, the second tier of the São Paulo state football league.

The club was for a short time known as Real Racing Primavera.

History
The club was founded on January 27, 1927, after the merger of local clubs Indaiatubano Futebol Clube and Primavera Futebol Clube. Primavera won the Campeonato Paulista Segunda Divisão in 1977, and the Campeonato Paulista Série B2 in 2001. The club joined a partnership with Spanish club Racing de Santander in 2007, and was renamed to Real Racing Primavera. After the partnership ended, the club was renamed back to Esporte Clube Primavera.

Achievements
 Campeonato Paulista Segunda Divisão:
 Winners (3): 1977, 1995, 2018
 Campeonato Paulista Série B2:
 Winners (1): 2001

Stadium
Esporte Clube Primavera play their home games at Estádio Ítalo Mário Limongi, nicknamed Estádio Gigante da Vila Industrial. The stadium has a maximum capacity of 9,542 people.

References

Association football clubs established in 1927
Football clubs in São Paulo (state)
1927 establishments in Brazil